Stuart Cowden (February 1925 – January 2016) was an English footballer who played for Stoke City.

Career
Cowden joined Stoke City during World War II and went on to become a regular in the War League playing 50 matches. His only senior match came in the FA Cup during the 1945–46 season where he played in a 3–1 win against Burnley. He left the club at the end of the season after he decided to work at Rolls-Royce Limited in Crewe where he stayed for 50 years. He continued to play football for non-league Witton Albion. He died in January 2016, a few weeks short of his 91st birthday.

Career statistics

References

External links
 Vintage Potter shares his memories of a special time Stuart Cowden at thisisstaffordshire.co.uk

English footballers
Stoke City F.C. players
1925 births
2016 deaths
Witton Albion F.C. players
Association football wing halves
People from Alsager